James Ivan Pollock (July 8, 1930 – October 28, 2021) was a politician in Ontario, Canada.  He was a Progressive Conservative member of the Legislative Assembly of Ontario from 1981 to 1990 who represented the riding of Hastings—Peterborough.

Background
Pollock was educated at Rawdon High School, and worked as a farmer before entering politics. He was a reeve of Rawdon Township, and a Warden in the County of Hastings. Pollock was also an active freemason.

Politics
He was elected to the Ontario legislature in the 1981 provincial election, defeating Liberal candidate Dave Hobson by just under 3,000 votes in the riding of Hastings—Peterborough. Elmer Buchanan of the NDP finished third. Pollock was a backbench supporter of Premiers Bill Davis and Frank Miller in the parliaments which followed. In 1983, he brought forward a resolution to make the blue jay the official bird of Ontario.

The Progressive Conservatives lost power following the 1985 election, although Pollock actually increased his majority.  He was one of only sixteen Progressive Conservatives re-elected in the 1987 election, defeating Liberal Carman Metcalfe and Elmer Buchanan of the NDP.

The Progressive Conservatives made a modest recovery in the 1990 provincial election, although Pollock lost his seat to Buchanan amid a provincial majority government victory for the NDP. Buchanan won the election by 896 votes.

References

External links 

1930 births
2021 deaths
Progressive Conservative Party of Ontario MPPs
People from Hastings County